Nora Kirkpatrick (born December 6, 1984) is an American director, writer and musician.

Early life
Kirkpatrick grew up in rural Iowa. She graduated from La Quinta High School. She graduated with a BA in theater from UCLA School of Theater, Film and Television.

Career
Kirkpatrick was a founding member and accordion player for the Grammy Award winning and platinum record selling band Edward Sharpe and the Magnetic Zeros. After seven years touring on the road she turned her focus to writing and directing, selling series to CBS, Hulu and Comedy Central among others. 

In 2020, Kirkpatrick became a writer on two Amazon series: Daisy Jones & The Six, produced by Reese Witherspoon, and Rodeo Queens starring Dakota Johnson. In 2019, Nora created, wrote and directed a 15- episode interactive television show for EKO and FunnyOrDie. This series, The Coop, co-starred Tony Hale, Bobby Moynihan, Bridget Everett and Margaret Cho. She directed episode #712 of The Goldbergs for ABC and was the first woman ever to direct a campaign for Bud Light. Nora helmed three commercials for the brand, shot during covid in 2020.

In 2018, Nora created, wrote and directed Door No. 1, a live-action VR comedy series, starring Snoop Dogg and Ravi Patel, for Hulu.  In a 2017 Forbes article, Kirkpatrick mentions virtual reality's ability to cause "spatial un-comfortability," and her aim to make the viewer the lead character of the story. In 2017, Nora sold her TV show Assisted Living to CBS, which was executive produced by Will Ferrell and Jessica Elbaum. 

In 2016, Nora co-wrote and directed a five-part VR comedy series, Virtually Mike and Nora, with SNL alum Mike O'Brien, which is currently airing on Hulu. That same year, Nora sold her TV show, Best Seller, to Comedy Central. It was produced by Gloria Sanchez Productions and Olivia Wilde and co-written by SNL alum Dennis McNicholas.

Her short films have played at film festivals all over the world garnering awards including Best Female Director at the Prague International Film Festival (2020) and the Grand Jury Prize at the San Diego Film Festival, Sioux City Film Festival and the Femme Filmmakers Festival.   She won a Davey Grant for her screenplay Long Time Listener, First Time Caller, and the Best Screenplay award from both Shore Scripts and Hollyshorts for Best Seller. 

As an actor, she is probably best known for her role as Katherine, the stern president of Panhellenic, on the ABC Family TV series Greek, or for her recurring role on the ninth season of The Office as Esther Bruegger, a neighboring farmer's daughter who becomes Dwight's girlfriend. Kirkpatrick starred in the 2015 film Pink Grapefruit, which won the SXSW Grand Jury Award. She has played many other roles in film and TV, including Men at Work, Jennifer Falls, Don't Trust the B, and Chasing Life. She was one of the leads of the popular mockumentary web series Dorm Life, in which she played Courtney Cloverlock.

Music 
Kirkpatrick played the accordion in the band Edward Sharpe and the Magnetic Zeros. She is a founding member and together they won a Grammy in 2013. She left the band after seven years in 2014 to focus on her directing career.

Personal life
Kirkpatrick married filmmaker Bryn Mooser in 2016.

Filmography

Directing & Writing

Film

Television

References

External links
 
 

1984 births
Living people
UCLA Film School alumni
21st-century American actresses
People from Peru, Illinois
Edward Sharpe and the Magnetic Zeros members